Jarkko Juhani Kinnunen (born 19 January 1984 in Jalasjärvi) is a Finnish race walker. His trainer is Kari Ahonen since 1999.

Achievements

References

1984 births
Living people
People from Jalasjärvi
Finnish male racewalkers
Athletes (track and field) at the 2008 Summer Olympics
Athletes (track and field) at the 2012 Summer Olympics
Athletes (track and field) at the 2016 Summer Olympics
Olympic athletes of Finland
World Athletics Championships athletes for Finland
Athletes (track and field) at the 2020 Summer Olympics
Sportspeople from South Ostrobothnia